Manimal is an American superhero television series created by Glen A. Larson and Donald R. Boyle, it ran on NBC from September 30 to December 17, 1983. The show centers on the character Jonathan Chase (Simon MacCorkindale), a shape-shifting man who can turn himself into any animal he chooses. He uses this ability to help the police solve crimes.

The series ended after a brief eight episode run, but has since become a minor cult classic.

Opening narration
For every episode except the pilot, actor William Conrad recites the opening narration that tells of Chase's wealthy present life and his early days in Africa with his missionary father:

Overview
Manimal premiered as a 90-minute pilot that aired on September 30, 1983. The series featured the story of Jonathan Chase, a shape-shifter who could turn himself into any animal he chose, and used this ability to fight crime. Only two people were aware of Jonathan's secret, his friend Ty Earl and Police Detective Brooke Mackenzie. Jonathan and Ty would assist Brooke with a case she was working on, with Jonathan transforming himself into an animal when it became useful.

While Jonathan had the ability to change himself into any animal, he would transform into a hawk and a black panther in nearly every episode. In some episodes, he would transform into a third animal, such as a horse, dolphin, bear, or bull, with the transformation taking place offscreen, though once he was shown becoming a snake. In one episode, he was shown to be able to assume the aspect of various animals simultaneously, rather than adopt their forms, such as the agility and speed of a panther or the suppleness and fast strikes of a snake. The transformation sequences were designed and created by the Academy Award-winning SFX artist Stan Winston.

Another aspect of the transformations that added to the show's camp factor involved Chase's clothing during a transformation: He was depicted generally wearing a three-piece suit and tie, and the viewer would see it rip off him as he shape-shifted into an animal, though once the transformation was complete there would be no sign of his discarded clothing. A bit later, he would transform back into human form with all of his clothing perfectly restored upon his person, even if he was unconscious.

Cast
 Simon MacCorkindale as Jonathan Chase
 Melody Anderson as Brooke Mackenzie
 Glynn Turman as Tyrone "Ty" C. Earl (pilot episode)
 Michael D. Roberts as Tyrone "Ty" C. Earl
 Reni Santoni as Lt. Nick Rivera
 William Conrad as Narrator (opening scene)
 Jack Greer as Young Jonathan Chase (pilot episode)

US television ratings

Episodes

Night Man
 Glen A. Larson, the creator, briefly resurrected the Jonathan Chase character for a crossover with his 1990s series Night Man. In that episode, Manimal's traditional, practical-effects transformation was abandoned in favor of a CGI sequence.

Home releases
On August 27, 2012, Manimal: The Complete Series was released on DVD in the UK in PAL region 2 by Fabulous Films. The three-disc set includes the TV-movie pilot and seven original full-length episodes. Special features includes a near 20-minute interview with series creator Glen A. Larson, production notes, biographies, galleries, Automan TV series trailer and episode guide booklet.

Manimal was released on DVD by Condor Entertainment (3 disc set) in France on October 18, 2012.

Shout! Factory released the complete series on DVD in Region 1 for the very first time on November 10, 2015.

Annual
In 1984, a Manimal Annual was released in the UK - a book containing stories, comics and games based on the show.

Reception and cancellation
Manimal was scheduled opposite CBS's highly popular prime time soap opera Dallas. The 90-minute pilot aired on September 30, 1983; the one-hour series debuted two weeks later, but was placed on hiatus after only four regular episodes had aired, with production ceasing at that time. The show returned to the NBC schedule a month later, airing the three remaining already-produced episodes before the show was officially canceled due to low ratings. NBC's 1983 fall line-up also featured eight other series that were axed before their first seasons ended (including Jennifer Slept Here, Bay City Blues, and We Got It Made).

Manimal is not well regarded by many TV viewers and the series received negative reviews from critics. John Javna's book The Best of Science Fiction TV included Manimal in its list of the "Worst Science Fiction Shows of All Time", along with  Space: 1999, Lost in Space, Buck Rogers in the 25th Century, and The Starlost. TV Guide also ranked Manimal number 15 on their list of the 50 Worst TV Shows of All Time in 2002. In 2004, readers of the British trade weekly Broadcast voted Manimal as one of the worst television shows ever exported by the U.S. to the U.K. It placed fifth on their list, exceeded only by Baywatch, The Anna Nicole Show, The Dukes of Hazzard and Wild Palms. The Ultimate Encyclopedia of Fantasy described Manimal thus: "Axed after seven regular episodes, the only surprise being that it ever got past the pilot stage".

Manimal was the subject of much sarcastic ribbing on fellow NBC show Late Night with David Letterman, including a nearly nine-minute segment called Manimal: Show At The Crossroads that aired November 8, 1983, after it was announced Manimal would be put on hiatus. After a detailed recounting of the show's plots, and a call to NBC headquarters to determine if the show would be brought back, a psychic was brought in to predict Manimal'''s future: the verdict was "nope, not on another network, not in syndication, not on home cassettes...it's a ghost, it's history, it's vapor".Manimal had an associated toy line of solid, non-articulated figurines sold as rack toys made by Fleetwood Toy Corporation.  These depicted the character in mid-transformation, such as to a cobra and to a lion.

Film
In September 2012, Sony Pictures Animation was developing a live-action/CGI film based on Manimal. The series creator and producer, Glen A. Larson, was once again attached as a producer. The film was slated to be produced by Will Ferrell and Adam McKay through their Gary Sanchez Productions, and by Jimmy Miller through his Mosaic Media Group. Jay Martel and Ian Roberts have been hired to write the script. Larson died in 2014, and as of 2021, no further news of the project has emerged since its announcement.

See alsoAutomanNight ManAnimorphs, a TV series adaptation of the book series of the same nameSheenaSpace: 1999'' (UK series that featured Maya, an alien woman with the same shape-shifting ability)

References

External links
 
 

1983 American television series debuts
1983 American television series endings
1980s American science fiction television series
English-language television shows
American fantasy television series
NBC original programming
Television series about shapeshifting
Television series by 20th Century Fox Television
Television series created by Glen A. Larson
Television shows set in Massachusetts